The Voice is the sixth studio album by American rapper Lil Durk. It was released on December 24, 2020, by Only the Family, Alamo Records and Geffen Records. The album contains guest appearances from late rapper King Von, 6lack, Young Thug, YNW Melly, and Booka600. A deluxe edition was released on January 29, 2021, with twelve additional tracks. It features additional guest appearances from Lil Baby, Pooh Shiesty, and Sydny August.

The Voice is Lil Durk's final album for Geffen Records, as his home label, Alamo Records, was acquired by Sony Music in June 2021. Since July 2021, the album is no longer distributed by Geffen Records.

Background
The title of the album is actually Lil Durk's longtime nickname. He had been teasing it for a while, starting with by posting a picture of him on social media, promoting the title track, on August 28, 2020. He initially stated he would release new music on the same day as rapper 6ix9ine's second studio album, TattleTales, amid their feud.

The album is a tribute to late American rapper King Von, a longtime friend and then-labelmate of the rapper, who died from a shooting in Atlanta, Georgia, on November 6, 2020. He was involved in a controversy in a nightclub in the premises of the area at around 3:20 a.m. between two groups of men, one of them being associated with fellow American rapper Quando Rondo. Both parties were using firearms to fight, and two off-duty police officers took part in making the situation come to a close by threatening to use additional gunfire. He was rushed to the hospital and after surgeries, he was pronounced dead. His passing affected Lil Durk heavily, who proceeded to deactivate all of his social media accounts until he announced the release of "Backdoor" on December 20, 2020. Thus, the cover of the album has a picture of the two together.

Singles
The album's lead single, its title track, was released along with a music video on September 4, 2020. The second single, "Stay Down", with American singer 6lack and American rapper Young Thug, was released along with a music video on October 30, 2020. The third single, "Backdoor", was released along with a music video on December 21, 2020.

Critical reception

The Voice received mixed reviews by music critics. Writing for Allmusic, Fred Thomas stated that "Many tracks on The Voice are built on melancholy piano loops and ethereal samples, but some of the more interesting moments of the album happen when he strays from the somewhat interchangeable instrumentation".

Commercial performance
The Voice debuted at number 46 on the US Billboard 200 chart, earning 23,000 album-equivalent units in its first week with 1 day of sales. The album was released on Thursday so the album's first-week sales came from just one day of activity due to it being the last day of the tracking week. In its second week, the album climbed to number three on the chart, earning an additional 66,000 units. The album sold 87,000 units the week the deluxe was released. This became Lil Durk's third US top-ten album. In its third week, the album climbed to number two on the chart, earning 48,000 more units. In its fourth week, the album dropped to number five on the chart, earning 42,000 units, bringing its four-week total to 179,000 units. On March 4, 2021, it was reported that the album sold over 500,000 copies and is eligible to be certified Gold. Geffen Records marketed the album for very short time, as Alamo Records was acquired by Sony Music in June 2021 and its distribution passed to Sony quickly after.

Track listing

Notes
 "Death Ain't Easy" features additional vocals from King Von

Charts

Weekly charts

Year-end charts

Certifications

References

2020 albums
Lil Durk albums
Albums produced by Hitmaka
Albums produced by Metro Boomin
Albums produced by TM88